St Augustine's Church is an active Church in Broxbourne, Hertfordshire, England. The church stands opposite the New River. It is recorded in the National Heritage List for England as a designated Grade I listed building

History
The church is mentioned in the Domesday Book, which lists Broxbourne parish and its priest, though details about the church building are not mentioned. The current structure is believed to have been built by 1460 and paid for by Sir John Say whose tomb is located south of the chancel. The south aisle of the church was extended by the mason Robert Stowell for Sir John Say in 1476. The church was expanded throughout the 15th and 16th centuries and also contains a memorial to John Loudon McAdam.

References

Grade I listed churches in Hertfordshire
Broxbourne